The 1953 Dunedin mayoral election was part of the New Zealand local elections held that same year. In 1953, elections were held for the Mayor of Dunedin plus other local government positions including twelve city councillors. The polling was conducted using the standard first-past-the-post electoral method.

Campaign
A major talking point in the lead up to the election was the potential of a clash with the 1953 Royal Tour. There were proposals to postpone local elections until early 1954 over fears of reduced turnout due to a conflicted schedule. The proposals were considered by the Minister of Internal Affairs William Bodkin, who ultimately decided against it.

Len Wright, the incumbent Mayor, was re-elected for a second term. He defeated a spirited challenge from Phil Connolly the sitting Labour MP for Dunedin Central, who despite losing the mayoralty was elected to the Otago Harbour Board, where he became deputy-chairman. Initially the Labour Party won a 8-4 majority on the city council, however after a recount Citizens' candidate Stuart Sidey displaced Labour's James Dalziel as the lowest polling successful candidate amending the party split to 7-5.

Mayoral results

Council results

Notes

References

Mayoral elections in Dunedin
Dunedin
Politics of Dunedin
1950s in Dunedin
November 1953 events in New Zealand